Check This Out is a live album by organist Jack McDuff recorded in Berkeley, California in 1972 and released on the Cadet label.

Track listing 
All compositions by Jack McDuff except as indicated
 "Three Blind Mice" - 9:44   
 "Georgia On My Mind" (Hoagy Carmichael, Stuart Gorrell) - 6:20   
 "Soul Yodel" - 6:03   
 "Middle Class Folk Song" - 6:02   
 "The Jolly Black Giant" - 3:28   
 "Red, White & Blooze" - 8:27

Personnel 
Jack McDuff - organ
Leo Johnson - flute, clarinet, tenor saxophone, tambourine
Dave Young - soprano saxophone, tenor saxophone, cowbell
Red Holloway -alto saxophone, tenor saxophone
Vinnie Corrao - guitar
Richard Davis - bass (track 3)
Ron Davis - drums
Willie Colon - congas

References 

 
Jack McDuff live albums
1972 live albums
Cadet Records live albums
Albums produced by Esmond Edwards
Culture of Berkeley, California